Chromista is a proposed but seemingly polyphyletic biological kingdom consisting of single-celled and multicellular eukaryotic species that share similar features in their photosynthetic organelles (plastids). It includes all protists whose plastids contain chlorophyll c, such as some algae, diatoms, oomycetes, and protozoans. It is probably a polyphyletic group whose members independently arose as a separate evolutionary group from the common ancestor of all eukaryotes. As it is assumed the last common ancestor already possessed chloroplasts of red algal origin, the non-photosynthetic forms evolved from ancestors able to perform photosynthesis. Their plastids are surrounded by four membranes, and are believed to have been acquired from some red algae. 

Chromista as a biological kingdom was created by the British biologist Thomas Cavalier-Smith in 1981 to differentiate some protists from typical protozoans and plants. According to Cavalier-Smith, the kingdom originally included only algae, but his later analysis indicated that many protozoa also belong to the new group. As of 2018, the kingdom is as diverse as kingdoms Plantae and Animalia, consisting of eight phyla. Notable members include marine algae, potato blight, dinoflagellates, Paramecium, the brain parasite Toxoplasma, and the malarial parasite Plasmodium.

Biology

Members of Chromista are single-celled and multicellular eukaryotes having basically either or both features:

 plastid(s) that contain chlorophyll c and lie within an extra (periplastid) membrane in the lumen of the rough endoplasmic reticulum (typically within the perinuclear cisterna);
 cilia with tripartite or bipartite rigid tubular hairs.

The kingdom includes diverse organisms from algae to malarial parasites (Plasmodium). Molecular evidence indicates that the plastids in chromists were derived from red algae through secondary symbiogenesis in a single event. (In contrast, plants acquired their plastids from cyanobacteria through primary symbiogenesis.) These plastids are now enclosed in two extra cell membranes, making a four-membrane envelope, as a result of which they acquired many other membrane proteins for transporting molecules in and out of the organelles. The diversity of chromists is hypothesised to have arisen from degeneration, loss or replacement of the plastids in some lineages. Additional symbiogenesis of green algae has provided genes retained in some members (such as heterokonts), and bacterial chlorophyll (indicated by the presence of ribosomal protein L36 gene, rpl36) in haptophytes and cryptophytes.

History and groups

Some examples of classification of the groups involved, which have overlapping but non-identical memberships, are shown below.

Chromophycées (Chadefaud, 1950)

The Chromophycées (Chadefaud, 1950), renamed Chromophycota (Chadefaud, 1960), included the current Ochrophyta (autotrophic Stramenopiles), Haptophyta (included in Chrysophyceae until Christensen, 1962), Cryptophyta, Dinophyta, Euglenophyceae and Choanoflagellida (included in Chrysophyceae until Hibberd, 1975).

Chromophyta (Christensen 1962, 1989)

The Chromophyta (Christensen 1962, 2008), defined as algae with chlorophyll c, included the current Ochrophyta (autotrophic Stramenopiles), Haptophyta, Cryptophyta, Dinophyta and Choanoflagellida. The Euglenophyceae were transferred to the Chlorophyta.

Chromophyta (Bourrelly, 1968)

The Chromophyta (Bourrelly, 1968) included the current Ochrophyta (autotrophic Stramenopiles), Haptophyta and Choanoflagellida. The Cryptophyceae and the Dinophyceae were part of Pyrrhophyta (= Dinophyta).

Chromista (Cavalier-Smith, 1981)

The name Chromista was first introduced by Cavalier-Smith in 1981; the earlier names Chromophyta, Chromobiota and Chromobionta correspond to roughly the same group. It has been described as consisting of three different groups: It includes all protists whose plastids contain chlorophyll c.

 Heterokonts or stramenopiles: brown algae, diatoms, water moulds, etc.
 Haptophytes
 Cryptomonads

In 1994, Cavalier-Smith and colleagues indicated that the Chromista is probably a polyphyletic group whose members arose independently, sharing no more than descent from the common ancestor of all eukaryotes: 

In 2009, Cavalier-Smith gave his reason for making a new kingdom, saying:

 
Since then Chromista has been defined in different ways at different times. In 2010, Cavalier-Smith reorganised Chromista to include the SAR supergroup (named for the included groups Stramenopiles, Alveolata and Rhizaria) and Hacrobia (Haptista  and Cryptista).

Chromalveolata (Adl et al., 2005)

The Chromalveolata included Stramenopiles, Haptophyta, Cryptophyta and Alveolata. However, in 2008 the group was found not to be monophyletic, and later studies confirmed this.

Classification

Cavalier-Smith et al 2015 

In 2015, Cavalier-Smith and his colleagues made a new higher-level grouping of all organisms as a revision of the seven kingdoms model. In it, they classified the kingdom Chromista into 2 subkingdoms and 11 phyla, namely:

Cavalier-Smith 2018 

Cavalier-Smith made a new analysis of Chromista in 2018 in which he classified all chromists into 8 phyla (Gyrista corresponds to the above phyla Ochrophyta and Pseudofungi, Cryptista corresponds to the above phyla Cryptista and "N.N.", Haptista corresponds to the above phyla Haptophyta and Heliozoa):

Paraphyly 

Molecular trees have had some difficulty resolving relationships between the different groups. All three may share a common ancestor with the alveolates (see chromalveolates), but there is evidence that suggests that the  haptophytes and cryptomonads do not belong together with the heterokonts or the SAR clade, but may be associated with the Archaeplastida. Cryptista specifically may be sister or part of Archaeplastida. A 2020 phylogeny of the eukaryotes states that "the chromalveolate hypothesis is not widely accepted" (noting Cavalier-Smith et al 2018 as an exception), explaining that the host lineages do not appear to be closely related in "most phylogenetic analyses". Further, none of TSAR, Cryptista, and Haptista, groups formerly within Chromalveolata, appear "likely to be ancestrally defined by red secondary plastids".

See also 
 Cabozoa
 Cavalier-Smith's system of classification
 List of Chromista by conservation status

References

External links 

UCMP: Introduction to the Chromista

Obsolete eukaryote taxa
Kingdoms (biology)